Whitefish River may refer to:

Canada

Ontario
Whitefish River (Berens River tributary), in Kenora District
Whitefish River (Lac Seul), in Kenora District 
Whitefish River (Night Hawk Lake), in Cochrane and Timiskaming Districts
Whitefish River (Sudbury District)
Whitefish River (Thunder Bay District)

Other rivers in Canada
Whitefish River (Manitoba)
Whitefish River (Northwest Territories)
Whitefish River (Saskatchewan)
Whitefish River (Yukon)

United States
Whitefish River (Michigan)
Whitefish River (Montana)

See also

Laughing Whitefish River, Michigan, U.S.